Silver Lake Creek is a short stream in Tay Valley, Lanark County in Eastern Ontario, Canada. It flows from Silver Lake to the Fall River and is in the Ottawa River drainage basin.

Course
The Fall River flows via the Mississippi River to Lac des Chats on the Ottawa River.

References

Rivers of Lanark County